Françoise Dürr and Darlene Hard were the defending champions but competed this year with different partners. Françoise Dürr teamed up with Gail Chanfreau, and lost in the semifinals to Margaret Court and Judy Dalton. Darlene Hard teamed up with Peaches Bartkowicz, and lost in the quarterfinals to Françoise Dürr and Gail Chanfreau.

Margaret Court and Judy Dalton won the title by defeating Rosemary Casals and Virginia Wade 6–3, 6–4 in the final.

Seeds

Draw

Finals

Top half

Bottom half

References

External links
1970 US Open – Women's draws and results at the International Tennis Federation

Women's Doubles
US Open (tennis) by year – Women's doubles
US Open - Women's Doubles}
US Open - Women's Doubles}